Monnujan Sufian (born 1 January 1953) is a Bangladesh Awami League politician who is the current Jatiya Sangsad member from Khulna-3 constituency and the current State Minister of Labour and Employment.

Background
Sufian completed her bachelor's from Khulna Girls' College in 1969. Her husband, Abu Sufyan Bir Protik, was a freedom fighter, politician and labor leader. She is the daughter of Late Alhaj Moslem Bawali and Late Johra Begum and the eldest among her siblings.

Career
Sufian served as the president of Khulna Girls' College unit of Bangladesh Chhatra League in 1968.

Sufian was elected to parliament from Khulna-3 as an Awami League candidate in 2008. She was appointed State Minister of Labour and Employment in the Second Sheikh Hasina Cabinet.

Sufian was re-elected to parliament from Khulna-3 as an Awami League candidate in 2014. She received 45,950 votes while her nearest rival, Independent Md. Moniruzzaman Khokon, received 6,424.

Sufian was sued by three faculty members of Daulatpur Day-Night College, of which she is the President of the managing committee, on 15 October 2015 alleging that they were unfairly dismissed from their workplace.

Sufian was re-elected to parliament from Khulna-3 as an Awami League candidate in 2018. She received 134,806 votes while her nearest rival, Rokibul Islam Bokul of Bangladesh Nationalist Party, received 23,060 votes.

References

Living people
1953 births
Awami League politicians
9th Jatiya Sangsad members
10th Jatiya Sangsad members
11th Jatiya Sangsad members
Women members of the Jatiya Sangsad
Women government ministers of Bangladesh
State Ministers of Labour and Employment (Bangladesh)
Place of birth missing (living people)
21st-century Bangladeshi women politicians